List of Red vs. Blue: The Chorus Trilogy episodes.

Season 11 (2013)
The Reds and Blues crash-land on a mysterious planet and wait to be rescued. However, mysterious forces are watching them.

Season 12 (2014)
The Reds and Blues are caught in the middle of a civil war on the former UNSC-colony Chorus. But all is not as it seems as a mysterious, sinister force manipulates both sides.

Season 13 (2015)
It's all-out war as the Reds and Blues lead the people of Chorus against a mercenary army led by Hargrove, Felix and Locus.

References

Lists of machinima series episodes
Red vs. Blue episodes